The 2001 Virginia lieutenant gubernatorial election saw Democrat Tim Kaine defeat Republican Jay Katzen.

Candidates 

 Tim Kane (Democratic), Former Mayor of Richmond
 Jay Katzen (Republican), State Delegate
 Gary Reams (Libertarian)

Results

References

2001 Virginia elections
Virginia lieutenant gubernatorial elections
Tim Kaine
Virginia